Beach handball at the 2008 Asian Beach Games were held from October 18 to October 25, 2008 in Bali, Indonesia.

Medalists

Medal table

Results

Men

Preliminaries

Group A 

|-
|18 Oct
|10:00
|align=right|
|align=center|0–2
|align=left|
|8–13||8–11||
|-
|19 Oct
|16:30
|align=right|
|align=center|2–0
|align=left|
|16–13||18–16||
|-
|20 Oct
|10:00
|align=right|
|align=center|2–0
|align=left|
|18–12||17–13||
|-
|20 Oct
|16:30
|align=right|
|align=center|2–1
|align=left|
|18–9||11–13||6–5
|-
|21 Oct
|15:30
|align=right|
|align=center|0–2
|align=left|
|10–13||15–19||
|-
|22 Oct
|14:30
|align=right|
|align=center|2–1
|align=left|
|9–10||14–12||8–7
|}

Group B 

|-
|19 Oct
|12:00
|align=right|
|align=center|0–2
|align=left|
|9–14||14–23||
|-
|19 Oct
|14:30
|align=right|
|align=center|0–2
|align=left|
|10–18||14–19||
|-
|20 Oct
|14:30
|align=right|
|align=center|2–0
|align=left|
|23–16||23–10||
|-
|21 Oct
|16:30
|align=right|
|align=center|0–2
|align=left|
|4–9||12–14||
|-
|22 Oct
|10:00
|align=right|
|align=center|1–2
|align=left|
|16–15||18–21||6–7
|-
|22 Oct
|16:30
|align=right|
|align=center|1–2
|align=left|
|5–20||14–10||1–4
|}

Classification 5th–8th

7th place match

|-
|24 Oct
|15:00
|align=right|
|align=center|1–2
|align=left|
|14–16||15–13||6–7
|}

5th place match

|-
|24 Oct
|17:00
|align=right|
|align=center|2–0
|align=left|
|13–12||12–8||
|}

Final round

Semifinals

|-
|23 Oct
|15:00
|align=right|
|align=center|1–2
|align=left|
|14–13||8–10||4–5
|-
|23 Oct
|17:00
|align=right|
|align=center|2–1
|align=left|
|8–10||7–4||11–10
|}

3rd place match

|-
|25 Oct
|10:00
|align=right|
|align=center|2–1
|align=left|
|15–16||16–11||12–10
|}

Final

|-
|25 Oct
|16:30
|align=right|
|align=center|1–2
|align=left|
|22–14||14–16||8–9
|}

Women

Preliminaries

Group E 

|-
|19 Oct
|09:00
|align=right|
|align=center|2–0
|align=left|
|20–8||20–7||
|-
|19 Oct
|11:00
|align=right|
|align=center|2–0
|align=left|
|12–11||13–11||
|-
|20 Oct
|09:00
|align=right|
|align=center|1–2
|align=left|
|12–18||15–9||4–5
|-
|21 Oct
|09:00
|align=right|
|align=center|2–0
|align=left|
|15–13||15–14||
|-
|22 Oct
|09:00
|align=right|
|align=center|0–2
|align=left|
|11–16||16–17||
|-
|22 Oct
|11:00
|align=right|
|align=center|0–2
|align=left|
|10–16||13–17||
|}

Group F 

|-
|18 Oct
|09:00
|align=right|
|align=center|2–1
|align=left|
|4–14||15–8||5–4
|-
|18 Oct
|11:00
|align=right|
|align=center|2–1
|align=left|
|6–13||13–9||7–6
|-
|19 Oct
|10:00
|align=right|
|align=center|2–0
|align=left|
|8–7||17–8||
|-
|19 Oct
|15:30
|align=right|
|align=center|0–2
|align=left|
|5–17||10–14||
|-
|20 Oct
|11:00
|align=right|
|align=center|2–0
|align=left|
|14–9||19–15||
|-
|20 Oct
|15:30
|align=right|
|align=center|2–1
|align=left|
|18–10||8–10||5–2
|-
|21 Oct
|10:00
|align=right|
|align=center|0–2
|align=left|
|6–14||9–18||
|-
|21 Oct
|14:30
|align=right|
|align=center|2–1
|align=left|
|8–13||10–6||5–2
|-
|22 Oct
|12:00
|align=right|
|align=center|0–2
|align=left|
|11–13||9–12||
|-
|22 Oct
|15:30
|align=right|
|align=center|0–2
|align=left|
|11–15||10–17||
|}

Classification 5th–8th

7th place match

|-
|24 Oct
|14:00
|align=right|
|align=center|0–2
|align=left|
|7–12||13–19||
|}

5th place match

|-
|24 Oct
|16:00
|align=right|
|align=center|2–0
|align=left|
|16–13||16–15||
|}

Final round

Semifinals

|-
|23 Oct
|14:00
|align=right|
|align=center|0–2
|align=left|
|12–15||12–16||
|-
|23 Oct
|16:00
|align=right|
|align=center|2–0
|align=left|
|9–8||13–9||
|}

3rd place match

|-
|25 Oct
|09:00
|align=right|
|align=center|2–0
|align=left|
|10–8||13–9||
|}

Final

|-
|25 Oct
|15:30
|align=right|
|align=center|0–2
|align=left|
|10–13||10–11||
|}

References
 Official site

2008 Asian Beach Games events
Asian Beach Games
2008